Professor Leslie Ronald George Treloar, OBE (30 July 1906 – 18 March 1985) was a leading figure in the science of rubber and elasticity, and writer of a number of influential texts.

Leslie Treloar graduated in Physics from University College, Reading, in 1927 and subsequently joined GEC. He gained his PhD from the University of London (external degree) in 1938. After working for GEC he moved to the British Rubber Producers Research Association. He worked briefly at the Telecommunications Research Establishment during World War II.

He moved to the British Rayon Research Association when it was set up in 1948. He was a colleague of John Wilson.

He was awarded the Colwyn Medal "for outstanding services to the rubber industry of a scientific, technical or engineering character" in 1961, and the Swinburne Award for his "outstanding contribution to the advancement and knowledge of any field related to the science, engineering or technology of plastics" in 1970. He also was awarded the A. A. Griffith Medal and Prize in 1972.

He became Professor of Polymer & Fibre Science in the University of Manchester Institute of Science and Technology in 1966 and retired in 1974.

Bibliography
Treloar published many texts and papers, of which the following is a selection:

Books

Papers

References

1906 births
1985 deaths
Alumni of the University of London
Polymer scientists and engineers
Officers of the Order of the British Empire
Academics of the University of Manchester Institute of Science and Technology